Lenka Tvarošková (born 14 February 1982) is a Slovak former tennis player.

Tvarošková won one singles title and 16 doubles titles on the ITF Circuit in her career. On 8 June 2009, she reached her best singles ranking of world No. 215. On 5 October 2009, she peaked at No. 127 in the doubles rankings.

ITF finals

Singles: 5 (1–4)

Doubles: 32 (16–16)

External links
 
 

1982 births
Living people
Tennis players from Bratislava
Slovak female tennis players
21st-century Slovak women